Dolores Marta Gracia de Gangotena y Jijón was an Ecuadorian art collector, conservationist. She was First Lady of Ecuador to Camilo Ponce Enríquez from 16 September 1956 to 31 August 1960.

Biography
Dolores Gangotena was born in Quito, the second of four children born to Enrique Gangotena y Jijón and Dolores de Jijón y Ascázubi. Through her mother, Gangotena was related to Juan de Salinas y Zenitagoya and Javier de Ascázubi, heroes of the war for Ecuador's independence. In 1940, Gangotena married Camilo Ponce Enríquez.

Despite prejudices of the times and the opposition of her father, Gangotena entered university and studied fine arts. The collection of pre-Columbian and Colonial-era Ecuadorian art became her passion.

As First Lady of Ecuador, Gangotena was the host of Carondelet Palace and attended national and international functions for her husband's government. Gangotena used this rural property to store most of her art collection.

Citations

First ladies of Ecuador
People from Quito
Conservator-restorers